Jingang may refer to:

Vajra, a ritual object known in Chinese religions as jingang
Jingang, Liuyang, a town in Liuyang, Hunan, China
Jingang Monastery, a Buddhist monastery in Kangding, Sichuan, China